George Bowman Wilson, Jr. (July 18, 1905 – May 3, 1990) was an American football player who played at Lafayette College.  He was elected to the College Football Hall of Fame in 1988.

During the Second World War, he joined the United States Marine Corps, eventually achieving the rank of brigadier general and receiving honors including the Legion of Merit.

References

External links

 

1905 births
1990 deaths
Lafayette Leopards football players
Frankford Yellow Jackets players
College Football Hall of Fame inductees
United States Marine Corps personnel of World War II
United States Marine Corps generals
Players of American football from Pennsylvania
People from Cheltenham, Pennsylvania
Sportspeople from Montgomery County, Pennsylvania
Military personnel from Pennsylvania